Ron Gerard is an American bridge player.

Bridge accomplishments

Wins

 North American Bridge Championships (4)
 Blue Ribbon Pairs (1) 1981 
 Mitchell Board-a-Match Teams (1) 1985 
 Spingold (1) 1981 
 Vanderbilt (1) 1990

Runners-up

 Cavendish Invitational Pairs (1) 1993
 North American Bridge Championships (7)
 North American Pairs (2) 1980, 1983 
 Grand National Teams (1) 1976 
 Mitchell Board-a-Match Teams (1) 1983 
 Truscott Senior Swiss Teams (1) 2001 
 Vanderbilt (2) 1994, 1995

Notes

American contract bridge players